Zachary Cooke-Collis (1754–1834) was Archdeacon of Cloyne from 1810 until his death. 

He was born in County Kerry and educated at Trinity College, Dublin Coke-Collis was ordained Deacon on 5 October 1777, and Priest on 21 September 1781. After a curacy at Litter he was the incumbent at Marshalstown.

References

1754 births
1834 deaths
Clergy from County Kerry
Alumni of Trinity College Dublin
Archdeacons of Cloyne